The Baker City Herald is a tri-weekly paper published in Baker City, Oregon, United States, since 1870. It is published on Mondays, Wednesdays and Fridays by EO Media Group and has a circulation of 2,304.

History
The Herald was established as the Bedrock-Democrat on May 11, 1870. Its founders were Milton H. Abbott, who had previously launched the Oregon Herald, and Lewis Linn McArthur. In 1887 Ira Bowen and George Small purchased the newspaper for $2500. Bowen and Small published the Daily Democrat and ran the Bedrock Democrat as a weekly edition. In 1929, the Bedrock-Democrat merged with the city's other daily paper, the Morning Herald, to become the Baker Democrat-Herald. When the city's name was changed from Baker back to Baker City in 1990, the paper was renamed to Baker City Herald. The Herald went from being published five days a week to three on June 1, 2009.

As of 2018, the paper's publisher is Karrine Brogoitti and its editor is Jayson Jacoby.

References

External links
 Baker City Herald (official website)

1870 establishments in Oregon
Baker City, Oregon
Newspapers published in Oregon
Oregon Newspaper Publishers Association
Publications established in 1870